HMD Motorsports (formerly BN Racing) is an American racing team in the IndyCar Series and Indy Lights series. The team is owned by Henry Malukas.

Road to Indy (2017–present)

USF2000 and Pro Mazda
The team entered the USF2000 series in 2017 running a limited schedule. Along with USF2000, the team also entered the 2018 Pro Mazda Championship with two cars, and had several wins.

Indy Lights

2019
HMD Motorsports (BN Racing) entered the 2019 Indy Lights series. David Malukas ran for the team in 2019 with a limited budget. Toby Sowery won the Sunday race at Portland for HMD Motorsports/Team Pelfrey. HMD was to run the 2020 Indy Lights series, but the season was cancelled due to COVID-19.

2021
HMD Motorsports, together with Global Racing Group fielded four cars to start the 2021 Indy Lights series season. Drivers included Benjamin Pedersen, Linus Lundqvist, Nikita Lastochkin, and David Malukas. Exclusive Autosport, due to delaying its planned Indy Lights entry, sold their two cars to HMD/GRG. Linus Lundqvist won Race 1 from pole at the Indy Lights Grand Prix of Alabama with teammate David Malukas winning Race 2 from pole. Malukas won Race 2 from pole at the Indy Lights Grand Prix of St. Petersburg. Lundqvist won the Indy Lights Grand Prix of Indianapolis Race 1 from pole with teammate Malukas winning Race 2 from pole. Malukas won Race 2 at Road America, both races at Gateway, and Portland Race 1. Lundqvist would use another car at Gateway due to a crash before the races. Manuel Sulaimán joined the team at Portland, replacing Lastochkin. Lundqvist won the season finale at Mid-Ohio.

2022
HMD partnered with Dale Coyne Racing for the 2022 Indy Lights series season. Drivers included Christian Bogle, Danial Frost, Linus Lundqvist, and Manuel Sulaimán. The teams partnership continued with Global Racing Group, fielding driver Benjamin Pedersen. Lundqvist won several races throughout the season, while teammate Frost won at the Indy Lights Grand Prix of Indianapolis Race 1. Sulaimán would leave the team and be replaced by Antonio Serravalle starting at Indianapolis. Kyffin Simpson would join the team starting at Iowa, moving over from TJ Speed. Serravalle would leave and be replaced by James Roe starting at Nashville, who also moved over from TJ Speed. Pedersen would win at Portland. Nolan Siegel joined the team for the season finale at Laguna Seca  Lundqvist would win the series championship at Race 1 of Laguna Seca.

2023
HMD Motorsports will field a entry for Force Indy driver Ernie Francis Jr. in 2023. HMD also took over the teams equipment and personal.

IndyCar (2022–present)

2022
HMD Motorsports partnered with Dale Coyne Racing to run David Malukas in the 2022 IndyCar Series.

Formula Regional Americas Championship (2020)

2020
HMD Motorsports entered the 2020 Formula Regional Americas Championship series with drivers David Malukas and Santiago Urrutia after the cancellation of the 2020 Indy Lights series. Logan Cusson joined the team starting at Barber Motorsports Park. Kyffin Simpson joined the team starting at Sebring International Raceway. David Malukas would win the Saturday race at Sebring. Marco Kacic joined the team for Circuit of the Americas.

Current series results

IndyCar Series

Indy Lights /  Indy NXT 

† Shared results with other teams.

Former series results

Pro Mazda Championship / Indy Pro 2000 Championship

U.S. F2000 National Championship 

† Shared results with other teams.

Formula Regional Americas Championship 

† Shared results with other teams.

References

External links
 

Formula Regional Americas Championship
Indy Lights teams
American auto racing teams
IndyCar Series teams
Formula Regional teams